Cosma is Lithuanian athletics sport club from capital city of Vilnius, which specialises in track and field events. It has won the most titles in LLAF Cup which is organized by Athletics Federation of Lithuania. Since 2009, it has held the Cosma Cup.

Notable members 
Notable athletes:
Lina Grinčikaitė, sprinter.
Rytis Sakalauskas, sprinter.
Sonata Tamošaitytė, hurdler.
Mantas Šilkauskas, decathlete and hurdler.
Vitalij Kozlov, middle distances runner.
Silvestras Guogis, 400 metres hurdler and sprinter.
Airinė Palšytė, high jumper.
Lina Andrijauskaitė, long jumper.
Mantas Dilys, triple jumper.
Andrius Gudžius, discus thrower.
Agnė Orlauskaitė, sprinter.
Karina Vnukova, high jumper.

Athletics clubs in Lithuania